David McKay (born 21 November 1984, in Glasgow) is a Scottish football striker currently without a club following his release from Clyde.

Career
McKay started the 2007–08 season playing amateur football, playing for both Drumchapel United and Swinton every weekend. He already had 75 goals to his name during the season before Clyde took an interest in him. He was capped by the Scotland Amateur international team, and was previously working in the A.G. Barr warehouse in Cumbernauld.

McKay signed for Clyde, his first professional club, on 19 February 2008, after impressing in a trial period, in which he scored two goals for the Reserve team.

He made his senior debut in a 2–1 defeat against Dunfermline Athletic on 23 February 2008. He is known for his speed, and can play as a winger as well as a striker. McKay scored all 4 goals in Clyde's Reserve League Cup Final victory over Livingston in May 2008, taking his total in the competition to 9 for the season.

He scored his first competitive goal for Clyde on 30 August 2008 in a 3–2 victory over St Johnstone. McKay's contract was terminated in June 2009, following Clyde's relegation and financial troubles, however, in July 2009, he signed a new one-month contract with the club. He left the club in December 2009.

Statistics
Correct as of 16 January 2009

See also
2007–08 Clyde F.C. season | 2008-09

References

External links

Living people
1984 births
Scottish footballers
Clyde F.C. players
Scottish Football League players
Association football forwards
Association football wingers